DWMN (94.1 FM), broadcasting as 94.1 Love Radio, is a radio station owned and operated by Manila Broadcasting Company. Its studio and transmitter is located at the 3rd Floor, Sam's Place, Caritan Centro, Tuguegarao City.

References

Love Radio Network stations
Radio stations in Cagayan
Radio stations established in 2008